Parnell Velko "P. J." Jones (born April 23, 1969) is an American professional racing driver. He has contested in multiple disciplines, including NASCAR, IndyCar, IMSA GT Championship, the American Le Mans Series, USAC, the Chili Bowl, and the Stadium Super Trucks.

Jones was runner-up at the GTP class of the IMSA GT Championship in 1993 and fourth in 1992. He also finished fourth at the 2002 NASCAR Winston Cup Series race at Watkins Glen, and second at the 1999 CART race at Nazareth. His father is Indianapolis 500 winner Parnelli Jones, his brother is Page Jones, a former racing driver, and one of his sons, Jagger Jones, currently races in the ARCA Menards Series West.

Racing career

Early career and 1980s
Jones' preliminary efforts in racing were, in a fashion not atypical for young drivers, focused on go-karting. Upon graduation from his introductory-level competitions, Jones began to enter the oval races at Ascot Park, much as his father did decades prior. Accumulating experience and accolades, Jones would progress vertically to United States Auto Club-sanctioned events. From numerous choices within the USAC governing body's expansive portfolio of open-wheel divisions, Jones opted to participate in the West Coast Midget category. 1986's racing season saw Jones earn the rookie of the year title in that class as the then-young driver began a quest to surpass his father in auto racing accomplishments; he had, by virtue of being a high school junior, already overtaken Parnelli in academic achievement.

As Jones continued to craft a reputation as the future of motorsport in USAC, he began to dabble in IMSA GT, foreshadowing the dawn of his career's peak, which would take place, at least in part, in the GTP classification within the series. At this stage, Jones was participating in the GTO and GTU classes with Clayton-Cunningham Racing and their stable of Mazda RX-7 vehicles. A partial season in both GTO and GTU left Jones just fourteenth and twenty-seventh in the respective standings.  Low rankings, however, would not overshadow Jones' ability in the rotary-engined racing car; instead, 1988 was highlighted by a podium finish in one of the GTU races.

In 1988, Jones also scored victory in a world championship sprint car race which transpired in Auckland, proving that his talents transcended both the scope of pavement racing and the borders of the United States of America.

The decade would not close without another racing reconnaissance from P.J. Jones; in this instance, he was surveying the American Racing Series with its turbocharged Buick formula cars. This series encompassed elements from both midget racing and sports car racing, serving as a fusion of lessons Jones had learned in his prior experience. Masterful in applying the skills he had developed as a youth, Jones triumphed on the Mid-Ohio Sports Car Course as he scored a victory to crown a season's efforts which would culminate in a sixth-place final classification.

In the same year, Jones was suspended for thirty days from USAC competition after deliberately colliding with a competitor's vehicle.

1990s
Jones returned to the American Racing Series in 1990. Though with the same team, and utilizing the same March/Buick package, Jones failed to score a single race victory. An unsuccessful foray into what is now NASCAR's K&N Pro Series West and a handful of forgettable trials at the wheel of a Ford Ranger in SCCA's Racetruck Challenge rendered this year particularly difficult from a Jonesian perspective. The promise of the 1980s had now faded into an oppressive doubt that could have jeopardized a blossoming career.

Jones was not the kind of prospect to be discouraged by slow development, though, and rose from the quiet 1990 to reestablish his potential as an auto racing champion in 1991. His season began in GTP, running the 24 Hours of Daytona for Dan Gurney and his All American Racers squad, which fielded a Toyota-powered Eagle HF90 in a race that would not see the loftiest of successes. Still, for Jones to even be considered by a man as keen in motoring matters as Gurney provided a much-needed elevation in confidence level that would propel Jones through the coming year, where his focus remained on the American Racing Series.

Racing down an avenue which would take him to the season's vice-runner-up position, Jones scored two victories in twelve races, exhibiting excellence on the narrow confines of treacherous street circuits in Toronto and Denver.  Having now proven that his talents were beyond the challenges the American Racing Series could offer, Jones would never return to the championship subsequent to 1991's conclusion.

Prior to the year's end, Jones participated in an ice race, much as fellow North American racing drivers Paul Menard and Greg Moore have at various stages in their own careers.

In 1992, Jones became a full-fledged professional racing driver, now joining Gurney's team for a full season's run in IMSA GTP piloting the brand-new Eagle MkIII. Jones was outclassed by his teammate, Juan Manuel Fangio II, who had taken the series title, but such results must be qualified with recognizance of the fact that Jones was a rookie in prototype competitions and had to adapt to the powerful cars which featured astronomical amounts of downforce. Fourth in points with two wins, as Jones was by the year's end, had far exceeded any reasonable expectations one could have for a young driver in such refined machinery.

Outside of Jones' two wins on the IMSA circuit, the second-generation driver dominated the 1992 Toyota Pro/Celebrity Race in Long Beach.

All American Racers retained Jones for 1993 and swept the championship and vice-championship positions in IMSA's GTP category with P.J. trailing Fangio.  Now acclimated to the Eagle MkIII Toyota, Jones capitalized on his year's GTP experience in the season-opening 24 Hours of Daytona, which he won. The victory was shared with co-drivers Mark Dismore and Rocky Moran, father of one of Jones' future sports car teammates. As an individual, Jones excelled, erasing any doubts that he relied too heavily on his partners for success. In a measure of pure pace, Jones rewrote the track record of Lime Rock Park with a lap of 43.112 seconds. To this day, no one has ever circulated the Western Connecticut racecourse's figure as quickly.

Never afraid of a challenge and always willing to broaden his résumé, Jones participated in NASCAR Winston Cup action when such events did not conflict with his sports car exploits. Limited in stock car experience but carrying abundant levels of natural driving talent, Jones was able to qualify for the majority of races he entered (six from eleven) and collect a top ten finish at historic Watkins Glen International at the iconic No. 9 Ford's wheel. The car was furnished by the Melling Racing stable and serviced by a team of mechanics led by Harry Hyde.

It was in the stock car direction that Jones' career would turn, with oval racing becoming the inclination of P.J.'s preferences even as he unofficially tested a CART engine for Toyota and Dan Gurney. The year began with the Chili Bowl, contested by both Jones brothers. Turned around early in the race, P.J. had to carve through the field; once a student of business, Jones was the professor of racecraft on that particular day, using a lower line than his competitors. As Page led the race, P.J. assumed second, and began to apply pressure on his younger brother as the crowd cheered for the third-place runner, Oklahoma's Andy Hillenburg. When lapped traffic, which included noted driver Ken Schrader, became involved in an incident directly in the paths of the leading cars, both Page and P.J. were eliminated from contention in the indoor midget race. P.J. was classified in the ninth spot.

Jones would contest many other midget races in 1994, often with his brother. In the USAC Silver Crown Series event on the IRP facility, P.J. would score a respectable second-place finish behind Mike Bliss, then the dominant driver on that particular circuit, after starting from the pole position.

Stock cars were, once again, on Jones' agenda, as well, and the Californian found himself in a number of NASCAR-branded divisions. Finding no success at the Winston Cup level in this season, Jones also turned to the Winston West series, where he won his first stock car race on the Phoenix International Raceway.  This event was a combined race between the two aforementioned NASCAR tours; Jones was classified in twenty-ninth overall driving for the Ultra Motorsports team with which he would enjoy later success.

NASCAR had also established a SuperTruck division, which was set to begin in 1995. Jones was a pioneer in that series, contesting the exhibition races in 1994 and into the following year. Racing seven times for Scoop Vessels, Jones picked up two victories (in Mesa Marin and again in Phoenix) which were underscored by a further pair of second-place finishes and another two third-place results. His seventh race ended outside of the top ten.

Jones secured the ride for 1995, as the original driver (his brother, Page) was recovering from injuries sustained in a midget crash. In official Truck Series running, Jones was less successful, faltering from a position of favor to that of a journeyman, scoring just two top ten finishes in thirteenth starts. After being released from the team, Jones renewed his desire to compete in Indy-style racers and continued to work on the Toyota CART project as he began an eight-year absence from NASCAR's Truck division.

As 1996 began, Jones was prepared for redemption, and found some in the Chili Bowl. In this edition, he would take the highest glory he ever achieved in the event: second place. It was a promising start to the newest journey on which Jones would embark.

With the Toyota engine now an official entrant in CART for 1996, Jones was hired as a driver for the All American Racers team and its Eagle MK-V Champ Car for an abbreviated season that would begin on the Milwaukee Mile, which hosted the series' seventh round. In his second CART race, Jones finished ninth, navigating the Belle Isle street course in the same way he had tackled temporary circuits in his American Racing Series days; this result earned the first points ever scored in a Toyota-powered CART special. Jones continued with this program through 1998; success was largely nonexistent, and points would only be accumulated one other time: Fontana 1997.

In 1999, Jones switched to the Patrick Racing team, abandoning one motorsport legend in Gurney to join another in Pat Patrick. The change of scenery was crucial to Jones' success, and the final year of the twentieth century would be at the height (and the conclusion) of P.J.'s time in CART. Four consecutive points-scoring finishes from Long Beach to Gateway, including a career-best runner-up result on the Nazareth Speedway marked a year that saw two other top ten classifications in Toronto and Cicero's races.

2000s
As with Scott Pruett and Robby Gordon, Jones decided to leave open-wheel racing and make a full-time switch to NASCAR, where he had spent the middle of the preceding decade. Unlike the other two former CART competitors, Jones would focus on the Busch Series rather than the premier Cup division, where he would enter just two races (one in relief of Gordon, who was participating in the rain-delayed 2000 Indianapolis 500 while the Coca-Cola 600 commenced with Jones in the cockpit of the No. 13 Burger King Ford).

Jones' season started with BACE Motorsports, a team which had won three Busch Series titles from 1995 to 1997. It was not to be a championship effort, however, even with a talent like Jones controlling the car styled as a Chevrolet Monte Carlo silhouette. With no results better than the twenty-fourth spot by the end of seven races, Jones was relieved of his driving duties, and relieved of the burdens that came with driving for an under-performing team.

David Ridling was impressed with Jones, and the driver would not remain a free agent for long. Without missing a single meeting of the Busch Series, Jones was in Ridling's No. 19, bettering his performances to include a seventeenth-place run on Loudon's Magic Mile and a top ten in the Watkins Glen event, a race over which Jones expressed disappointment weeks later in Nazareth, claiming in an interview on CBS with Glenn Jarrett that he and the team "should have won."

Jones would return to Watkins Glen in August for the second of his two Winston Cup races; he was quietly twenty-first for Felix Sabates and SABCO Racing as a substitute driver for Ted Musgrave, himself a replacement to the late Kenny Irwin Jr. (against whom Jones had race in USAC).

By September, rumors were circulating that Jones could join a newly formed Galaxy Motorsports and Robert Yates Racing conglomerate for the next season.  The team never formed.

The Busch Series was a suitable home for Jones, and he returned in 2001 with Phoenix Racing, a team owned by James Finch and sponsored by Yellow Freight, the same brand featured on his Ridling car the prior year. Qualifying third for the season-starting Daytona race and scoring a best result of seventeenth on the Atlanta Motor Speedway's oval (reconfigured from when it featured an infield road course on which Jones had raced in IMSA GTP), Jones was not able to please team manager Marc Reno. He was ousted for Jimmy Spencer, significant in that Spencer would later succeed him at both Ultra Motorsports and the Arnold Development team; he would not be the last driver Phoenix would release prematurely, joined now in that category by his former midget rival Mike Bliss, among others.

With 2001's disappointment now trailing him as another car on a train of unfortunate circumstances and less-than-stellar results, Jones spent 2002 in a variety of series, including the USAC Silver Crown Series where he had found success earlier in his career. Jones parlayed this into a chance to run the Indianapolis 500-mile race with Team Menard; it was to be his Indy Racing League debut and return to top-level North American open-wheel racing after a hiatus that inaugurated on October 31, 1999. Misfortune was still inseparable from Jones, and a neck injury during May's practice runs removed him from the competitive mount; his replacement, Raul Boesel, placed the car on the front row.

Jones' relationship with Menards was not over, though; a Busch Series race at Phoenix was scheduled later in the year, and Jones contested that NASCAR sweepstakes in a Chevrolet wearing the home improvement chain's livery.

Between these events, though, was the SIRIUS Satellite Radio at the Glen, a Winston Cup bout to take place on the New York road course where Jones had vast experience and a prior top ten. A. J. Foyt selected Jones for the race, giving the figurative keys to the No. 14 Conseco Pontiac's ignition over to a driver who, like Foyt, had participated in a variety of racing disciplines. Although Jones had failed to qualify for the previous race, the Brickyard 400, in Foyt machinery, this race was to be the statistical high point of Jones' NASCAR career. Jones finished fourth, impressing with his ability to brake later than most of his competitors on the run into turn one.

Jones would be invited to return to the Foyt team in 2003, this time for the Dodge/Save Mart 350 to be held on the Sonoma Raceway. For the second time in three attempts with Foyt, Jones failed to qualify for the race, frustrating Foyt to the point that Jones would not be welcomed back to defend his top five from 2002. Instead, Jones would race a Pontiac Grand Prix for Morgan-McClure Motorsports; he finished twenty places further down the order than he had the previous year.

Nearly a decade removed from his Winston West win with Ultra Motorsports, Jones returned to the Jim Smith-captained team for the Craftsman Truck Series' season-closer. Jones has not seen the Homestead-Miami Speedway, site of this race, since his CART days; it was newly redesigned for 2003, so this was not to Jones's detriment. In the No. 27 Dodge, a special entrant that was not normally found on the rosters of Truck Series races but had been dispatched to Florida to try to help the team secure a driver's championship for Ted Musgrave, Jones scored a top ten finish, reminding the auto racing world of how strong he had once been in a racing truck.

In May 2004, Jones was finally able to make his debut in the Indianapolis 500, a race his father won in 1963. The rain-shortened race was reduced in length for all competitors, but even more so for Jones, who crashed.

Jones would be on NASCAR's sidelines until June 2004. Don Arnold was trying to establish his new team, campaigning Dodge-brand stock cars, and believed that Jones could help in this difficult process. Debuting at Pocono Raceway, Jones took a solid twenty-second place, besting even the best performance of a Daytona 500 champion like Derrike Cope, who had only managed twenty-ninth in his brightest day for Arnold Development.  The subsequent four races all ended in dismay, with Jones and the No. 50 team retiring from each of these races before ending their relationship.

Jim Smith, pleased with Jones' services from the prior year, brought the driver back to his team for the Fontana and Phoenix races, two Western rounds for a Western driver. The No. 2 team had been using a rotating lineup of racing talents all season, so Jones did not displace anyone, even though he was participating in a racing truck that ran the full schedule. Mirroring the successful performance with Ultra in the West Series race of 1994, Jones scored a top ten in the Truck round in Phoenix, a rare highlight in a promising career soiled by unplanned failure.

Appearances were sparse in 2005, as ten of Jones' fourteen scheduled races ended prior to the race; Jones was unable to qualify for these events. Mostly racing with MACH 1 Motorsports, Jones was also able to land the Morgan-McClure ride for the road courses. In both rides, Jones struggled mightily, now deeply into the twilight of his NASCAR career.

2006, like 2004, began in May for Jones, once again in the Indianapolis 500. Beck Motorsports hired Jones to pilot the No. 98 CURB Records entry, identical in sponsor and number to the 2004 special Jones had driven. Running a Panoz chassis, widely regarded as inferior to the Dallara which populated a greater portion of the field, Jones lacked pace and only managed to qualify on the final row. However, a nineteenth-place result was salvaged.

The next stop on the Jones racing calendar was Sonoma, now becoming a tradition with Jones characterized in NASCAR as a road course ringer. Jones did not see the race out to its completion in his Morgan-McClure Chevrolet due to rear end failure, and would not return to the NEXTEL Cup Series that season.

Instead, Jones retreated to the Busch division, where his success had been limited in the earlier parts of the noughties. Starting last in Mike Curb's Diversified Partners Dodge for the July Daytona race, Jones mastered the slipstreaming techniques of NASCAR's draft and worked his way to thirteenth by the race's end in a reinvigorating performance. The IRP meeting would not end as successfully for Jones, who then moved to Johnny Davis Motorsports to compete in Watkins Glen. A stellar eighth-place qualifying effort was squandered by an engine failure on the seventh lap of the motor race; Jones had taken the JD Motorsports car to places it had never been on the grid's north end, and was compensated with mechanical incompetence. He would never race for Davis again, and returned to Curb for the Fontana and Phoenix legs as he had for Smith in the 2004 Truck Series season. Twenty-second and twenty-first were the results in those races.

As NASCAR Busch Series left the United States for the Autódromo Hermanos Rodríguez, Richard Childress Racing brought Jones with their team for the road course event. Another top ten qualifying run turned into a mediocre result; this time, Jones was twenty-fourth.

The disappointment would intensify in May, however, when Jones failed to qualify for the 2007 Indianapolis 500. His No. 40 car had been painted to resemble the one his father used in the 1967 Indianapolis 500 forty years prior; that car was powered by a turbine gas engine and used a four-wheel drive system. Both technologies had since been outlawed at the Speedway and were not featured on the 2007 entry for Jones.

Putting this behind him, Jones progressed to the NASCAR West Series race on the Sonoma Raceway. Starting seventh and finishing second, Jones regained his rhythm in the No. 24 Ford one day before he would participate in the Cup Series race on the same track. That, too, was an impressive day for Jones, as he took a Michael Waltrip Racing Toyota from the final grid position to twelfth, his best NASCAR result since 2002. MWR would request his talents for the Watkins Glen race in August, and Jones would oblige. This time, he was classified as twenty-fifth.

Additionally, Jones raced in the Pennsylvania 500 for Robby Gordon Motorsports after the driver for which the team was named was suspended for actions detrimental to stock car racing. The race's victor finished a full two laps ahead of Jones on the triangular circuit.

MB Motorsports decided Jones was worthy of a chance in the Truck Series in 2008, giving the driver their No. 63 Ford for two races.  Results could not be produced and the series which Jones had been part of at the onset would never again be graced by his driving abilities.

Jones did not just close his Truck Series career, however. He made his final West Series and Nationwide starts; both were DNFs.

Of course, his dips into the Sprint Cup Series action did continue. Jones had a lackluster run in the Hall of Fame Racing Toyota in the 2008 Watkins Glen race. In 2009, he reunited with Robby Gordon Motorsports to test his skills in the start-and-park style of motoring; he conserved the car in two races that year and ensured that Gordon would collect purse money without having to worry about repairing damage or refurbishing worn parts.

2010s

Jones' devotion to Robby Gordon did not change in the fourth decade of his racing career, and he participated in a further five events for the RGM team in 2010 and 2011; he was never allowed to go the full distance. Eighteen years removed from his 1993 debut, Jones made his final appearance in the Cup Series on his most successful track, Watkins Glen. A mechanical failure prevented Jones from completing his qualifying lap, meaning he would not be allowed to start the race.  Unceremoniously, he was out of the sport that had been a constant through years of sports car and open-wheel fluctuation, never considered again for a ride.

His focus in 2011 had not been the Cup side, though. Rocketsports Racing hired Jones to race with Rocky Moran Jr. in their factory Jaguar XKR GT program in the American Le Mans Series. The car's performance was woeful, and no points were scored, even in rounds where fewer than ten cars had entered, as the car often failed to complete 70% of the class winner's distance due to chronic mechanical issues. Despite Moran's indications that the two would be paired again in 2012, Rocketsports and Jaguar disbanded the team and moved to the LMPC class without either driver.

Jones joined the General Tire Trophylite Race Series off-road truck division for 2012, finding a place to utilize his Baja 1000 experience. In Henderson, Nevada, Jones was victorious.

The 2013 season began at the Chili Bowl midget car race for Jones. He won the seventh heat race on opening night in his RFMS Racing entry. By the week's end, he had been eliminated from contention, and did not feature in the main event. Later in the year, he finished fourth in the inaugural Stadium Super Trucks race at University of Phoenix Stadium. He continued to race in SST that season, resulting fourth in the standings with a win at Las Vegas.

Jones continued racing in the Stadium Super Trucks—albeit on a part-time basis—from 2014 to 2017. He scored race wins at the Grand Prix of St. Petersburg in 2014, the OC Fair & Event Center's Sand Sports Super Show in 2015, and Texas Motor Speedway in 2017.

In 2017, Jones returned to NASCAR, racing in the Xfinity Series race at Watkins Glen International in Chris Cockrum Racing's No. 25 car.

Personal life
Jones was a proficient ice hockey player, scoring ninety-eight goals (coincidentally, Jones often wears this number when racing) in thirty games when he was just short of one decade old and playing peewee hockey in California. He and his team were state champions that year. Any ideas of a professional career in Jones' other sport were hindered by a surgery six years after the championship; following another two years of play, Jones ceased participation in ice hockey of all kinds.

In his late teens and early twenties, Jones enrolled in several courses at El Camino College.  While there, he studied various subsets in the overarching field of business education.

Jones has an interest in aircraft. His biography in CART media materials often indicated that Jones was an avid flyer, holding a pilot's license at the time. As far as religion, Jones is irreligious.

With predominantly vehicular passions, Jones shares his love of motors to customers through PJ's Performance, which specializes in UTVs.  This venture has kept Jones busy even as his entries to auto races dwindle in quantity.

Married to Jolaina, Jones is the father of Jagger and Jace Jones. His residence has been established in Scottsdale, Arizona.

Motorsports career results

American Open-Wheel racing results
(key) (Races in bold indicate pole position)

American Racing Series/Indy Lights

CART

IRL IndyCar Series

Indianapolis 500

NASCAR
(key) (Bold – Pole position awarded by qualifying time. Italics – Pole position earned by points standings or practice time. * – Most laps led.)

Sprint Cup Series

Xfinity Series

Craftsman Truck Series

 Season still in progress
 Ineligible for series points

ARCA Racing Series
(key) (Bold – Pole position awarded by qualifying time. Italics – Pole position earned by points standings or practice time. * – Most laps led.)

Stadium Super Trucks
(key) (Bold – Pole position. Italics – Fastest qualifier. * – Most laps led.)

References

External links

 
 P.J. Jones at Driver Database

American Le Mans Series drivers
Living people
1969 births
Sportspeople from Torrance, California
Racing drivers from California
Indianapolis 500 drivers
24 Hours of Daytona drivers
NASCAR drivers
Champ Car drivers
Indy Lights drivers
IMSA GT Championship drivers
Stadium Super Trucks drivers
Irreligion in the United States
ARCA Menards Series drivers
Michael Waltrip Racing drivers
USAC Silver Crown Series drivers
A. J. Foyt Enterprises drivers
Richard Childress Racing drivers